Festival Too is a free music festival held yearly in King's Lynn, Norfolk, in the East of England, running throughout July. It has been running since 1985. It is free for anyone to attend, and is funded by donations and through local business support. in the region of 60,000 attend over the three weeks, with headline night audiences reaching 12–14,000  every year allowing it to grow from a budget of around £5000 to around £100,000. The festival spans across three weeks with line-ups including well known acts, plus local music acts (such as Battle of the Bands winners). Since 2018 there has also been a Festival Too Fringe. 

Some major acts who have performed at Festival Too include.

Notable Acts
The festival is normally held across three weekends in July. The first weekend is held in King Staithe Square, while the final two weekends are held in the Tuesday Market Place. Notable acts normally appear across the final two weekends.

Due to the Covid-19 Pandemic Festival Too did not take place in 2020 or 2021 but returned to both the King Staithe Square (for the first weekend) and the Tuesday Market Place (for the second and third weekend) in 2022.

2022 

 K-Klass
 Rozalla
 Fleur East DJ Set
 Judge Jules
 Reef
 Heather Small
 Will Young

2019
 Judge Jules 
 Nadine Coyle 
 Cast 
 5ive
 Marti Pellow

2018
 Angelo Starr
 Pixie Lott
 The Sherlocks
 The Darkness

2017
 KT Tunstall
 Space
 Busted

2016
 Phats and Small
 The Vamps
 The Wonder Stuff
 Gabrielle

2015
 Heaven 17
 Bucks Fizz
 Republica
 Only the Young
 Dodgy
 The Fratellis

2014
 Katrina Leskanich
 Aswad
 Toploader
 Scouting for Girls

2013
 Gareth Gates
 Diana Vickers
 The Loveable Rogues
 Stooshe
 Blue

2012
 The Pigeon Detectives
 Brand New Heavies
 Soul II Soul
 Marcus Collins
 Ryan O'Shaughnessy
 Lemar

2011
 The Lightning Seeds
 Sophie Ellis-Bextor
 The Hoosiers
 The Feeling

2010
 Lemar
 The Wanted
 Hayseed Dixie
 The Beat

2009
 S Club 3
 Beverley Knight

References

External links 
 Festival Too website

Music festivals in Norfolk